This is a list of Chinese poetry anthologies or collections, referring to those poetry anthologies which contain collections of poems written in Classical Chinese or Modern Chinese, and generally containing works by various authors, known or anonymous. In some cases, the anthologies are part of a lineage or tradition, building on the work of former collections. The "classic" collection was the Shijing ("Book of Songs", or "Odes"), traditionally believed to have been chosen by Confucius out of thousands gathered by royal order. The idea that the selection was based upon moral order became a strong influence on later anthologies. Similarly, the number 300, or 305, became canonical. Chinese literary tradition has long tradition of continuity, demonstrated in poetry anthologies.

This is a list of Chinese poetry anthologies. The list is variously sortable by clicking on the radio buttons (up-and-down arrows/triangles) in the column-headers.

See also
:Category:Poetry-related lists

General
Classical Chinese poetry
Chinese art
Shi (poetry) (the Chinese term for poetry)
Chinese literature
Chinese classic texts
List of national poetries
Modern Chinese poetry
:Category:Chinese translators

Poetry works and collections
:Category:Chinese poetry collections
Gao Bing
List of Chuci contents
List of Three Hundred Tang Poems poets
Orchid Pavilion Gathering
Sunflower Splendor: Three Thousand Years of Chinese Poetry
Wangchuan ji
Yan Yu (poetry theorist)

Notes

Anthologies
Poetry-related lists
Poetry anthologies